Hawling Manor in Hawling, Gloucestershire is a Grade II listed building.

History
Information from Country Life  states that the manor "was held in 1066 by the Countess Goda, sister of Edward the Confessor...." The present building dates from the 16th century, with some additions and alterations from the 17th through to the 20th century, with St Edward's Church next door, according to Country Life.

Owner
James Holder, co-founder of SuperGroup plc until June 2016, is the current owner of Hawling Manor.

References

Grade II listed houses in Gloucestershire
Country houses in Gloucestershire